Maurice Paul (born 3 February 1992) is a German footballer who plays as a goalkeeper.

References

External links
 

1992 births
Living people
Sportspeople from Hanau
German footballers
Association football goalkeepers
Kickers Offenbach players
VfB Germania Halberstadt players
TuS Koblenz players
3. Liga players
Regionalliga players
Footballers from Hesse
SC Hessen Dreieich players